Gelanor siquirres is a species of neotropical spiders from Costa Rica in the family Mimetidae.

References

Mimetidae
Spiders described in 2016
Spiders of Central America